Thomas Fergusson may refer to:

Thomas Riversdale Colyer-Fergusson
Sir Thomas Colyer Colyer-Fergusson, 3rd Baronet (1865–1951) of the Colyer-Fergusson baronets

See also
Thomas Ferguson (disambiguation)
Fergusson (disambiguation)